The mayor of Newburyport is the head of the municipal government in Newburyport, Massachusetts. There was no mayor of Newburyport until 1851, because up to that point Newburyport was still incorporated as a town.

List of mayors

Notes
 Currier, John James: History of Newburyport, Mass: 1764-1905, Volume 2, 
Newburyport (Mass.) 1909.  Appendix XI. pages 602-612; Mayors and Members of the Board of Aldermen, 1851 to 1909.
The Newburyport Mayor’s Office, mayors from 1950 to 2000.

Newburyport